Rhythm in the Air is a 1936 British comedy dance film directed by Arthur B. Woods and starring husband and wife dance partnership American Jack Donohue and Norwegian Tutta Rolf.  The film was a quota quickie production, written by Donohue in collaboration with Vina de Vesci, and was reportedly largely autobiographical, as the events in the film closely mirrored Donohue own experience of coming to be a dancer.

Plot
Jack Donovan (Donohue), a riveter working on the construction of a high-rise building, is distracted from his work by spying through a nearby window on a lissom young woman Mary (Rolf) as she rehearses her tap-dancing routines.  When she finishes, he pauses to give the unsuspecting Mary an ovation of cheers and wolf-whistles, but in the process loses his balance and falls to the ground, breaking both ankles.

The sympathetic Mary, who witnessed his fall, later visits him in hospital.  Finding him very attractive, she claims that as his bones start to mend, tap-dancing is a wonderful way to strengthen his muscles and joints.  He laughs at the absurdity of the suggestion.

Fully recovered, Jack goes back to his job, only to find that he has developed a new and severe fear of heights and it is quite impossible to continue in his line of work.  He meets up again with Mary, and now takes her up on her suggestion of learning to tap.  He finds he has a natural aptitude, and soon takes up dancing professionally.  The couple fall in love, and are soon married.

Cast
 Jack Donohue as Jack Donovan
 Tutta Rolf as Mary
 Vic Oliver as Tremayne
 Leslie Perrins as Director
 Kitty Kelly as Celia
 Tony Sympson as Alf
 Terry-Thomas as Frankie

External links 
 
 Rhythm in the Air at BFI Film & TV Database

1936 films
1936 comedy films
British black-and-white films
British comedy films
British dance films
Films directed by Arthur B. Woods
Quota quickies
1930s dance films
1930s English-language films
1930s British films